The 2008 Supertaça de Angola (21st edition) was contested by Interclube, the 2007 Girabola champion and Primeiro de Maio, the 2007 Angola Cup winner. In the away match, Interclube beat Maio 1–0 to secure their 1st title as the 2nd leg home match ended in another win 2-1 win for Interclube.

Match details

First Leg

Second Leg

See also
 2007 Girabola
 2007 Angola Cup
 Interclube players
 Primeiro de Maio players

External links
 Match info at rsssf.com

References

Supertaça de Angola
Super Cup